Route 247 is a north/south highway on the south shore of the Saint Lawrence River in the Estrie region of Quebec. Its northern terminus is in Magog at the junction of Route 112 and its southern terminus is in Stanstead, at the junction of Autoroute 55 less than 1 kilometre north of the Canada–United States border.

Part of this highway straddles the Canada–United States border along Canusa Street, separating Beebe Plain, Vermont from Beebe Plain, Quebec.

Municipalities along Route 247
 Stanstead (ville)
 Ogden
 Stanstead (township)
 Magog

See also
 List of Quebec provincial highways

References

External links 
 Provincial Route Map (Courtesy of the Quebec Ministry of Transportation) 
 Route 247 on Google Maps

247
Transport in Magog, Quebec